Campiglossa philippinensis is a species of tephritid or fruit flies in the genus Campiglossa of the family Tephritidae.

Distribution
The species is native to the Philippines.

References

Tephritinae
Insects described in 1974
Diptera of Asia